The R493 is a regional road in County Tipperary, Ireland linking Nenagh, via Puckane, Coolbawn, Ballinderry where it crosses the Ballyfinboy River and Terryglass to Carrigahorig.

See also
 Roads in Ireland - (Primary National Roads)
 Secondary Roads
 Regional Roads

References

Regional roads in the Republic of Ireland
Roads in County Tipperary